Treutlera is a monotypic genus of flowering plants belonging to the family Apocynaceae. It only contains one known species, Treutlera insignis Hook.f.

It is native to Nepal, the East Himalaya and Assam in India.

The genus name of Treutlera is in honour of William John Treutler (1841–1915), a British doctor who also worked at Kew Gardens. The Latin specific epithet of insignis means significant. Both the genus and the species were first described and published in Hooker's Icon. Pl. Vol.15 on table 1425 in 1883.

References

Apocynaceae
Apocynaceae genera
Plants described in 1883
Flora of East Himalaya
Flora of Nepal
Flora of Assam (region)